Berghausen is a former municipality in the district of Leibnitz in the Austrian state of Styria. Since the 2015 Styria municipal structural reform, it is part of the municipality Ehrenhausen an der Weinstraße.

Geography
Berghausen lies on the eastern end of the south Styrian Weinstraße on the border of Slovenia.

References

Cities and towns in Leibnitz District